The Riverside Palace is located in Gondal, India.

This palace has artifacts collected by the royal family, pictures, and trophies of heads of stuffed animals fixed on walls. The Riverside and the Orchard Palace are currently run as hotels. The living room here has the elegance of colonial architecture and has rich antique furniture. An exclusive Indian wing of this palace has beautiful brass ware and miniature paintings.

References

Bibliography

Palaces in Gujarat
Tourist attractions in Rajkot district